Events from the year 1971 in Kuwait.

Incumbents
Emir: Sabah Al-Salim Al-Sabah
Prime Minister: Jaber Al-Ahmad Al-Sabah

Events

Births

 4 September - Mohamed Al-Hamar.

See also
Years in Jordan
Years in Syria

References

 
Kuwait
Kuwait
Years of the 20th century in Kuwait
1970s in Kuwait